The Große Schweimke is a river of Lower Saxony, Germany.

It flows initially in a southwesterly direction before swinging west and discharging into the Kleine Steinau.

See also 
List of rivers of Lower Saxony

Sources 
Topographische Karte 1:25000, Nr. 4228 Riefensbeek (source)
Topographische Karte 1:25000, Nr. 4227 Osterode im Harz (mouth)

Rivers of Lower Saxony
Rivers of the Harz
Göttingen (district)
Rivers of Germany